The 2012 Rogers Cup (known as such for sponsorship reasons) was a tennis tournament played on outdoor hard courts. It was the 123rd edition (for the men) and the 111th (for the women) of the Canadian Open, and was part of the ATP World Tour Masters 1000 of the 2012 ATP World Tour, and of the WTA Premier 5 tournaments of the 2012 WTA Tour. The women's and legends' events were held at the Uniprix Stadium in Montreal, from August 4 to August 13 and the men's event at the Rexall Centre in Toronto, from August 4 to August 12.

Points and prize money

Point distribution

Prize money
All money is in U$:

ATP singles main-draw entrants

Seeds
The following players were seeded in the main singles draw, following the ATP rankings of July 30, 2012:

Other entrants
The following players received wild cards into the main singles draw:
  Frank Dancevic
  Peter Polansky
  Vasek Pospisil

The following player received entry as a special exempt:
  Sam Querrey

The following players received entry from the singles qualifying draw:
  Michael Berrer
  Flavio Cipolla
  Fabio Fognini
  Wayne Odesnik
  Sergiy Stakhovsky
  Jürgen Zopp

The following player received entry as a lucky loser:
  Matthew Ebden

Withdrawals
  Nicolás Almagro
  Roger Federer
  David Ferrer
  Juan Carlos Ferrero
  Robin Haase
  Feliciano López
  Gaël Monfils
  Rafael Nadal
  Andy Roddick
  Fernando Verdasco
  Stanislas Wawrinka

Walkovers
  Andy Murray (knee injury)

ATP doubles main-draw entrants

Seeds

 Rankings are as of July 30, 2012

Other entrants
The following pairs received wildcards into the doubles main draw:
  Philip Bester /  Adil Shamasdin
  Frank Dancevic /  Vasek Pospisil
The following pair received entry as alternates:
  Mardy Fish /  Mark Knowles

Withdrawals
  Radek Štěpánek

Retirements
  Victor Troicki (back injury)

WTA singles main-draw entrants

Seeds
The following players were seeded in the main singles draw, following the WTA rankings of July 30, 2012:

Other entrants
The following players received wild cards into the main singles draw:
  Eugenie Bouchard
  Stéphanie Dubois
  Aleksandra Wozniak

The following players received entry from the singles qualifying draw:
  Tímea Babos
  Kiki Bertens
  Jana Čepelová
  Sesil Karatantcheva
  Michelle Larcher de Brito
  Aravane Rezaï
  Arantxa Rus
  Anna Tatishvili

The following players received entry as a lucky loser:
  Urszula Radwańska
  Galina Voskoboeva

Withdrawals
  Petra Cetkovská (right ankle sprain)
  Kaia Kanepi (bilateral Achilles tendon injury)
  Maria Kirilenko (right leg injury)
  Svetlana Kuznetsova (right ankle injury)
  Monica Niculescu (left hand injury)
  Andrea Petkovic (right ankle injury)
  Maria Sharapova (stomach virus)
  Zheng Jie (low back injury)
  Vera Zvonareva (illness)

Retirements
  Victoria Azarenka (right ankle sprain)
  Simona Halep (left thigh injury)
  Flavia Pennetta (right wrist injury)

WTA doubles main-draw entrants

Seeds

1 Rankings are as of July 30, 2012

Other entrants
The following pairs received wildcards into the doubles main draw:
  Eugenie Bouchard /  Aleksandra Wozniak
  Sharon Fichman /  Marie-Ève Pelletier
The following pair received entry as alternates:
  Jill Craybas /  Carla Suárez Navarro

Withdrawals
  Flavia Pennetta (right wrist injury)

Retirements
  Sabine Lisicki (left abdominal sprain)

Finals

Men's singles

 Novak Djokovic defeated  Richard Gasquet, 6–3, 6–2

It was Djokovic 12th Masters 1000 title (2nd of the year), and his 31st title of his career (3rd of the year).

Women's singles

 Petra Kvitová defeated  Li Na, 7–5, 2–6, 6–3

Men's doubles

 Bob Bryan /  Mike Bryan  defeated  Marcel Granollers /  Marc López, 6–1, 4–6, [12–10]

It was the Bryan twins 18th Masters 1000 title (2nd of the year), and 80th title of their careers together (6th of the year).

Women's doubles

 Klaudia Jans-Ignacik /  Kristina Mladenovic  defeated  Nadia Petrova /  Katarina Srebotnik, 7–5, 2–6, [10–7]

References

External links
 Official website

 
2012 ATP World Tour
2012 WTA Tour
August 2012 sports events in Canada
2012